"Break a Sweat" is a song by American singer and rapper Becky G. It was released on August 21, 2015. An accompanying music video was released onto Gomez's official Vevo account on October 9, 2015.

Background and release
"Break a Sweat" was originally intended for American singer Demi Lovato. Lovato reportedly "stormed off" from the studio after an argument with Dr. Luke, who later offered the song to Gomez. It was released for digital download on August 20, 2015. The audio for the song was uploaded to YouTube and Vevo, on the same day of its release. A lyric video was uploaded onto Gomez's official Vevo account on September 4, 2015.

Music video
The music video for "Break a Sweat" was released on October 9, 2015, via Vevo, and was also uploaded to YouTube the same day. The video included product placement for brands such as CoverGirl and Beats Electronics. As of November 2019, the video has gathered over 46 million views.

Charts

Awards and nominations

Release history

References

2015 songs
Becky G songs
Songs written by Dr. Luke
Songs written by Emily Warren
Song recordings produced by Dr. Luke
Songs written by Becky G